Guney-ye Markazi Rural District is in the Central District of Shabestar County, East Azerbaijan province, Iran. At the National Census of 2006, its population was 7,189 in 2,109 households. There were 9,065 inhabitants in 2,859 households at the following census of 2011. At the most recent census of 2016, the population of the rural district was 10,136 in 3,239 households. The largest of its seven villages was Daryan, with 4,138 people.

References 

Shabestar County

Rural Districts of East Azerbaijan Province

Populated places in East Azerbaijan Province

Populated places in Shabestar County